Lawrance Lindsay (7 October 1921 – 5 February 1985) was a Scottish footballer who played for Dumbarton, Crewe and Dundee.

References

1921 births
1985 deaths
Scottish footballers
Dumbarton F.C. players
Crewe Alexandra F.C. players
Dundee F.C. players
Scottish Football League players
English Football League players
Association football defenders